Blaze is the given name of:

 Blaze Berdahl (born 1980), American actress, singer, rapper, voice-over actor, announcer and narrator
 Blaze Jordan (born 2002), American baseball player
 Blaze Riorden (born 1994), American lacrosse goalie
 Blaže Ristovski (1931–2018), Macedonian linguist, folklorist and historian